Telemaco Ruggeri (15 September 1876 – 15 October 1957) was an Italian actor and film director of the silent era.

Selected filmography
 Floretta and Patapon (1913)
 Woman Against Woman (1921)
 Take Care of Amelia (1925)

References

Bibliography
 Jandelli, Cristina. Le dive italiane del cinema muto. L'epos, 2006.

External links

1876 births
1957 deaths
People from Narni
Italian male film actors
Italian male silent film actors
20th-century Italian male actors
Italian film directors